Song Yiren  (born 7 May 1993), also known as Ireine Song, is a Chinese and Canadian actress. She is known for her role as Sang Sang in the historical fantasy drama Ever Night (2018).

Early life and education
Song emigrated to Canada with her parents when she was eight. She attended high school and university there where she majored in fashion design, but later dropped out.

In 2012, Song returned to China and enrolled in Beijing Film Academy. Song first made her appearance in the variety program Day Day Up.

Career
In 2015, Song made her acting debut in the historical romance film Time to Love, based on the novel Bu Bu Jing Xin by Tong Hua. She then starred in youth film At Cafe 6 and wuxia film Sword Master in 2016.

In 2018, Song rose to fame for her role as Sang Sang in the historical fantasy drama Ever Night.

In 2019, she starred in the youth sports drama The Prince of Tennis, and fantasy romance drama Flavor It's Yours.

In 2020, Song starred in the romance drama The Best of You in My Mind  and Professional Single .

Filmography

Film

Television series

Discography

Awards and nominations

References

1993 births
Living people
Actresses from Shandong
21st-century Chinese actresses
Beijing Film Academy alumni
Chinese television actresses
Chinese film actresses